The Santana 228 is an American sailboat that was designed by W. Shad Turner as a cruiser and first built in 1978.

The Santana 228 is a development of the Santana 28, which it replaced in production. It uses the same hull design as the 28, but with a newly-designed, wedge-shaped coach house roof and a taller mast.

Production
The design was built by W. D. Schock Corp in the United States, from 1978 to 1980, with 47 boats completed, but it is now out of production.

Design
The Santana 228 is a recreational keelboat, built predominantly of fiberglass. It has a masthead sloop rig, a raked stem, an internally mounted spade-type rudder and a fixed fin keel. It displaces  and carries  of ballast.

See also
List of sailing boat types

References

External links
Photo of a Santana 228

Keelboats
1970s sailboat type designs
Sailing yachts
Sailboat type designs by W. Shad Turner
Sailboat types built by W. D. Schock Corp